Tornesch is a town in the district of Pinneberg, in Schleswig-Holstein, Germany. Tornesch is also the home of the Klaus-Groth-Schule, named after the German poet Klaus Groth. It is also home to the Fritz-Reuter-Schule, named after German writer Fritz Reuter.

History
Tornesch has a place in biochemical history from the wood saccharification process developed by Scholler, also known at the Scholler-Tornesch process.  The first factory to use the process was built in Tornesch.  This early work was part of the development of biofuel such as cellulosic ethanol.

References

External links
Fritz-Reuter-Schule
Klaus-Groth-Schule homepage
Tornesch Cultural Center

Towns in Schleswig-Holstein
Pinneberg (district)